Dreamtime Christmas All-Stars were an all-star collaboration of Australian celebrities. They released one single, "Twelve Days of Christmas", which reached No. 26 on the Australian ARIAnet Singles Chart.

Members

Shannon Noll
Human Nature
Cosima
Jimmy Barnes
Zinc
Rob Mills
Amity Dry
Tahyna Tozzi
Kyle
Katie Underwood
Bob Downe
Shakaya
Bobby McLeod
Todd Williams
Glenn Skuthorpe
Matty Johns

Track listing
"Twelve Days of Christmas" (2004) - EMI Music Australia
 "Twelve Days of Christmas"
 "Happy Christmas (War Is Over)"
 "Santa Claus Is Comin' to Town"
 "Twelve Days of Christmas" (Pee Wee Ferris Remix)

Charts

References

Australian pop music groups
Charity supergroups